Jacques Ogg (born 28 August 1948 in Maastricht) is an international Dutch keyboardist on the harpsichord and fortepiano, and a conductor. He specializes in Classical and Baroque music on period instruments.

Jacques Ogg studied harpsichord in Maastricht with Anneke Uittenbosch and organ with Kamiel D'Hooghe. From 1970 to 1974, he continued his harpsichord studies with Gustav Leonhardt at the Amsterdam Conservatory from which he graduated and received a diploma in harpsichord. Jacques Ogg is currently known for his conducting activities and for playing harpsichord and fortepiano, including both solo concerts and with other musicians, such as Wilbert Hazelzet on the baroque flute and Jaap ter Linden on the baroque cello and viola de gamba. He also plays as a soloist with the baroque orchestra, Orchestra of the Eighteenth Century.

Since 2000, he has been the artistic director of the Lyra Baroque Orchestra in St Paul, Minnesota. Jacques Ogg has given masterclasses worldwide in countries including Brazil, Canada, Spain, Portugal, Argentina, Poland, and the United States. 
Ogg has made many recordings over the years. One of his most well known recordings is Bach's Goldberg Variations.

He is a professor at the Royal Conservatory of The Hague, Netherlands, where he makes his recordings either solo or with friends who are playing with him.

References

External links
 Jacques Ogg website
 Arkivmusic - Jacques Ogg's recordings
 Bach Cantatas - Jacques Ogg

1948 births
Living people
Dutch conductors (music)
Male conductors (music)
Dutch harpsichordists
Fortepianists
Dutch performers of early music
Bach musicians
Academic staff of the Royal Conservatory of The Hague
Musicians from Maastricht
People associated with the Royal Academy of Music
21st-century conductors (music)